The Portland Royal Naval Hospital was a naval hospital on the Isle of Portland, Dorset, England. Serving HMNB Portland at Portland Harbour, the hospital is located close to Castletown. Discounting earlier, temporary incarnations of the hospital, the permanent naval hospital was built at the beginning of the 20th century. It closed in 1957, when it was handed over to the National Health Service, which still runs the hospital as NHS Portland Community Hospital.

History

Before the main hospital was constructed, an early incarnation was established in the naval dockyard, while the Portland Royal Navy's Sick Quarters and Zymotic Hospital (Infectious Diseases branch) was located at Castle Road, near the incline of the Merchant's Railway. Around the turn of the century, a permanent general hospital at Castle Road was established. Completed by 1906, the original site was made up of an officers' block, administration block, surgical block and medical block. An un-timetabled station, Portland Hospital Halt, provided railway access to the site.

During World War II, an underground operating theatre was constructed. Along with the surgical block, it was the only section of the hospital to be in full-time operation. After suffering bomb damage in 1940, a decision was made for as many patients as possible to be moved to a less vulnerable site. Minterne House, located at Minterne Magna in Dorchester, was requisitioned for this purpose, leaving Portland's hospital to become a casualty and emergency hospital only. Despite this, it would receive 5,222 inpatients over the course of the war.

The hospital became surplus to requirements and was handed over to the National Health Service in 1957. The underground operating theatre, although rewired during 1954-5, was then stripped of much of its equipment. In 1996, the Portland Rotary were successful in gaining access to the theatre for a weekend of public tours. Steel gates were then put on the tunnel entrances and the theatre has remained closed to the public since. By 2005, some out-buildings of the hospital site were demolished to make way for Foylebank Way, a residential area for the elderly above 55 years of age.

See also
 Healthcare in Dorset
 List of hospitals in England

References

Defunct hospitals in England
Hospitals in Dorset
Isle of Portland
Military hospitals in the United Kingdom
Royal Navy Medical Service